Mirco Born (born 28 June 1994) is a German professional footballer who plays as a midfielder for FC Astoria Walldorf.

Club career
Born was born in Haren.

He made his debut in the Eredivisie for FC Twente on 2 September 2012 when he came on for Luc Castaignos in the 81st minute of the match against VVV Venlo. In January 2014, he returned to Germany to fourth tier Regionalliga West side Viktoria Köln for the remainder of the season.

After not being able to establish himself at Viktoria Köln, he returned to Twente first. In early August 2014 however, his contract was dissolved and he moved to the reserve team of Bundesliga side Hertha BSC. From 2015 to 2017 Born played for fourth tier club SV Meppen. He joined 2. Bundesliga side SV Sandhausen in July 2017.

References

External links
 
 Profile at Voetbal International 

1994 births
Living people
German footballers
Association football forwards
Germany youth international footballers
Eredivisie players
3. Liga players
Regionalliga players
FC Twente players
FC Viktoria Köln players
Hertha BSC II players
SV Meppen players
SV Sandhausen players
FSV Frankfurt players
German expatriate footballers
German expatriate sportspeople in the Netherlands
Expatriate footballers in the Netherlands
Jong FC Twente players